James Grierson (1662–1732) was a Scottish minister of the Church of Scotland who served as Moderator of the General Assembly in 1719. He was the first "second charge" to become Moderator.

Life

He was ordained as a minister of the Church of Scotland in Wemyss in September 1698. In 1709 he was "called" by the Presbytery of Edinburgh to be "second charge" of the highly influential and prestigious Trinity College Church. Although he is recorded as "second charge" it is unclear who (if any) was "first charge" when he arrived. In 1714 James Bannatine came as first charge, but in 1719 it was Grierson as second charge, not Bannatine as first charge, who was elected Moderator of the General Assembly. This peculiarity was partially redressed in 1739 when Bannatine in turn was elected Moderator.

Grierson died of palsy, following a long period of illness, on 5 July 1732.

Family

He married the daughter of Rev Matthew Selkrig (1643-1729), minister of Crichton, Midlothian.

References
Citations

Sources

1662 births
1732 deaths
Moderators of the General Assembly of the Church of Scotland
17th-century Ministers of the Church of Scotland
18th-century Ministers of the Church of Scotland